Cheung Chau Ferry Pier serves the island of Cheung Chau, New Territories, Hong Kong. It is located on Praya Street within the Cheung Chau Typhoon Shelter.

History
The pier, designed by the Port Works Division of the former Public Works Department, was officially opened on 28 April 1960. It was substantially expanded in 1986 and 1987. Renovation and improvement works in 2015 saw the passenger waiting area expanded, ventilation improved, and a new canopy constructed at the pier entrance.

Services
Sun Ferry operates a regularly scheduled route to Central Pier No. 5 in Central. The service runs "ordinary" (slower) ferries, as well as faster catamaran vessels. The average daily patronage of this route was 26,315 in 2015.

Future development
In 2019, the Civil Engineering and Development Department (CEDD) commissioned a private consultant to study the feasibility of reconstructing the pier. The department outlined various objectives for this project including increasing the pier's passenger handling capacity and addressing the ageing of the pier structure. The preliminary proposal is to build a new pier to the north of the current one.

See also
 Cheung Chau Public Pier – a separate pier to the south

References

1960 establishments in Hong Kong
Cheung Chau
Piers in Hong Kong